The 1969 New Mexico Lobos football team was an American football team that represented the University of New Mexico in the Western Athletic Conference (WAC) during the 1969 NCAA University Division football season.  In their second season under head coach Rudy Feldman, the Lobos compiled a 4–6 record (1–5 against WAC opponents) and were outscored, 281 to 171.

Willie Shaw and Rocky Long were the team captains. The team's statistical leaders included Rocky Long with 865 passing yards, Sam Scarber with 534 rushing yards, and John Stewart with 391 receiving yards, and David Bookert with 30 points scored.

Schedule

References

New Mexico
New Mexico Lobos football seasons
New Mexico Lobos football